Anna Maria Rizzoli (born 26 August 1951, in Rome), is an Italian actress.

Rizzoli started her career as glamour model and in the second half of the 1970s entered the cinema industry, becoming a star of the commedia sexy all'italiana. She also worked in television, appearing in several TV-series and hosting some shows, including the 1979 Sanremo Music Festival, and on stage where she worked with Giorgio Strehler.

Partial filmography 

 Sins Within the Family (1975) - The Girl taking Milo by car (uncredited)
 The Boss and the Worker  (1976)
 Ride bene... chi ride ultimo (1977) - Domizia Benti-Contini (segment "Prete per forza")
 Blazing Flowers (1978) - Nadina / Fiorella
 Where Are You Going on Holiday?  (1978) - Margherita (segment "Sì buana")
 Scusi lei è normale?  (1979) - Anna Maria Immacolata Grisaglia
 Riavanti... Marsch! (1979) - Immacolata-Francesco's Wife
 Play Motel  (1979) - Patrizia
 The Precarious Bank Teller  (1980) - Vanna
 L'insegnante al mare con tutta la classe (1980) - Lisa Colombi
 La cameriera seduce i villeggianti (1980) - Marina - la moglie di Orazio
 La ripetente fa l'occhietto al preside  (1980) - Angela Pastorelli
 La settimana bianca (1980) - Angela Marconcini
 Arabella (1980, TV Mini-Series) - Olimpia Rosier
 La compagna di viaggio (1980) - Lilly
 La settimana al mare (1981) - Angela Marconcini
 Uno contro l'altro, praticamente amici  (1981) - Silvana
 Una vacanza del cactus (1981) - Angela
 I ragazzi di celluloide (1981, TV Mini-Series) - Marilde
 Attenti a quei P2 (1982) - Madame J. De Groschild / Marisa Pappalardo
 Il sommergibile più pazzo del mondo (1982) - Angela
 La sai l'ultima sui matti? (1982) - Vanessa Lelli, dottoressa
 Le bourreau des cœurs (1983) - Ginette (final film role)

References

External links 
 

1953 births
Living people
Italian film actresses
Italian television presenters
Italian television actresses
Italian stage actresses
20th-century Italian actresses
Italian women television presenters